Reverend Father Mariampillai Xavier Karunaratnam was a minority Sri Lankan Tamil, Roman Catholic parish priest and a human rights activist. He was the Chairperson  of the  NESHOR and was killed on 20 April 2008 allegedly by a Deep Penetration Unit  of the Sri Lankan Army  . In a press release, NESOHR condemned, "in the strongest possible terms", the Sri Lankan state for the assassination of Rev.Fr. Karunaratnam.

Biography
M. X. Karunaratnam was born in Jaffna. He was an officer with the Bank of Ceylon before  he was ordained as a priest in 1989. Father Karunaratnam was founder and Chairman of NESHOR. He was also the Chairman of NGO Consortium of Jaffna. He was engaged in relief work for war displaced and worked in the tsunami relief.

Background
M. X. Karunaratnam was a priest of the Jaffna Diocese and served in the Vanni region of Sri Lanka and worked from the LTTE controlled parts of Sri Lanka.  He worked for human rights and called on the United Nations  and foreign human rights organisation to monitor the human rights situation in Sri Lanka .

 Earlier  two other NESHOR members and  Tamil National Alliance MPs A. Chandranehru and Joseph Pararajasingham were killed. He was extremely critical of the Sri Lankan government.

Incident
He was killed in the Mallaavi-Vavunikku'lam Road in Vanni after he was returning from a Sunday mass and going to a remembrance ceremony for a Tamil National Alliance MP a pro LTTE party Kiddinan Sivanesan who was also killed similar fashion. He killed by a claymore blast  carried out allegedly by a Deep Penetration Unit (DPU) of the Sri Lanka Army.

Reaction
Rev Fr. Damian Fernando, National Director of Caritas Sri Lanka, said:

National Peace Council of Sri Lanka has called his death  
Tamil National Alliance in a press statement said

See also
 Joseph Pararajasingham
 K. Sivanesan
 Ariyanayagam Chandra Nehru

References

External links
 
 
 Father Karunaratnam: martyred serving the Tamil people
 TIC Mourns Fr. Karunaratnam
Church condemns 'cowardly' killing of Sri Lanka priest
Sangam Grieves Loss of Fr. Karunaratnam

1951 births
2008 deaths
Sri Lankan Tamil priests
Sri Lankan Tamil activists
People murdered in Sri Lanka
20th-century Sri Lankan Roman Catholic priests
People from Jaffna
21st-century Sri Lankan Roman Catholic priests